The News of the World royal phone hacking scandal was a scandal which developed in 2005 to 2007 around the interception of voice mail relating to the British royal family by a private investigator working for a News of the World journalist. It formed a prelude to the wider News International phone hacking scandal which developed in 2009 and exploded in 2011, when it became clear that the phone hacking had taken place on a much wider scale. Early indications of this in the police investigation were not followed through, and the failures of the police investigation would go on to form part of the wider scandal in 2011.

In August 2006, the News of the Worlds royal editor, Clive Goodman and a private investigator, Glenn Mulcaire, were arrested by the Metropolitan Police, and later charged with hacking the telephones of members of the royal family by accessing voicemail messages, an offence under section 79 of the Regulation of Investigatory Powers Act 2000. On 26 January 2007, both Goodman and Mulcaire pleaded guilty to the charges and were sentenced to four and six months imprisonment respectively. On the same day, it was announced that Andy Coulson had resigned as editor of the News of the World.

Overview

Background
On 13 November 2005, an article appeared in the News of the World written by royal editor Clive Goodman, that claimed that Prince William was in the process of borrowing a portable editing suite from ITV royal correspondent Tom Bradby.

Following the publication, the Prince and Bradby met to try to figure out how the details of their arrangement had been leaked, as only two other people were aware of it. Prince William noted that another equally improbable leak had recently taken place regarding an appointment he had made with a knee surgeon. After some discussion, the Prince and Bradby concluded it was likely that their voicemails were being accessed.

Their concerns were passed to the Metropolitan Police, who set up an investigation under Deputy Assistant Commissioner Peter Clarke, who managed the Counter Terrorism Command. Clarke reported to Assistant Commissioner Andy Hayman, commander of the Specialist Operations directorate. The reason the investigation was passed to Hayman and Clarke, was that Hayman's command included the Protection Command, under whom SO14 provide all Royalty Protection.

Clarke's investigation began as a localised incident involving staff at Clarence House, but the compiled list of possible victims broadened to include: Government ministers; a Member of Parliament; military chiefs; a leading media figure; Premiership footballers; and celebrities. Clarke's investigation team searched the London office of the News of the World, eventually concluding that the compromised voice mail accounts belonged to Prince William's aides, including Jamie Lowther-Pinkerton, and not the Prince himself.

Goodman and Mulcaire trial
On 8 August 2006, Clarke's team arrested three men, including Goodman and former footballer turned private investigator Glenn Mulcaire. After releasing the third man, in consultation with the Crown Prosecution Service, Goodman and Mulcaire were charged with hacking the telephones of members of the royal family by accessing voicemail messages, an offence under section 79 of the Regulation of Investigatory Powers Act 2000. Goodman was subsequently suspended by the paper.

In September 2006 lawyers for News of the World parent company Newsgroup Newspapers told the police that 

During the subsequent court hearing, the jury were told that Goodman and Mulcaire made a total of 609 calls to the royal staff members' numbers, with Goodman making 487 calls, while Mulcaire made 122 calls. Over this period, the News of the World had paid Mulcaire £104,988 for his services, on top of which Goodman had additionally paid Mulcaire £12,300 in cash between 9 November 2005 and 7 August 2006, hiding Mulcaire's identity by using the code name Alexander on his expenses sheet. The court heard that Mulcaire had also hacked into the messages of: supermodel Elle Macpherson; publicist Max Clifford; MP Simon Hughes; football agent Skylet Andrew; and the Professional Footballers' Association's Gordon Taylor.

On 26 January 2007, Mr Justice Gross jailed Goodman for four months, having previously pleaded guilty to the charges. His associate and private investigator Glenn Mulcaire, was imprisoned for six months. On the same day, it was announced that Andy Coulson had resigned as the editor of the News of the World a fortnight earlier. He was immediately replaced by former Sunday Mirror editor and previously executive editor of the New York Post, Colin Myler, hired by News International Chairman Les Hinton.

Unfair dismissal claim
Goodman subsequently filed an unfair dismissal claim against News Group Newspapers Limited, his former employer and the publisher of The Sun and The News of the World. Goodman started his claim against his former employer, engaging defence lawyer John Kelsey-Fry, on the grounds that the practice of phone hacking was widespread at the newspaper group. To defend their case, News International hired London-based media specialist solicitors Harbottle & Lewis.

During its work for News International, Harbottle & Lewis took possession of hundreds of internal emails. In a letter dated 29 May 2007, sent to News International head of legal affairs Jon Chapman, Lawrence Abramson of Harbottle & Lewis wrote that:

This letter was subsequently used by various News International executives in their defence during a parliamentary investigation into phone hacking in 2009.

Chapman then wrote to News International chairman Les Hinton, that the company was likely to lose the case filed by Goodman, based on grounds of failing to follow specified contractual employment law procedure. This could result in a payment of £60,600 to Goodman, plus his notice period. Hinton hence authorised an out of court settlement to Goodman, covering the sum indicated by Chapman, plus Goodman's legal costs. After settlement of Goodman's case, a similar amount was authorised to Mulcaire after he also started legal action, again settled out of court on Hinton's authorisation.

Subsequent legal cases
In October 2019, it was announced that Prince Harry had sued the now-defunct News of the World and its sister paper The Sun "in relation to alleged phone-hacking". Clive Goodman had previously stated that he had hacked Harry's phone on nine occasions.

See also

 News media phone hacking scandal
 CTB v News Group Newspapers
 List of alleged victims of the News of the World phone hacking scandal
 Mosley v News Group Newspapers Limited
 Politico-media complex
 Sheridan v News International

References

2007 in law
2007 in the United Kingdom
Journalistic scandals
News International phone hacking scandal
Political scandals in the United Kingdom
British royalty
Royal scandals